Deeringothamnus (known as "false pawpaw") is a genus of flowering plants with two species, belonging to the Annonaceae family. They are native to Florida. Both are federally listed endangered species of the United States.

Species
Deeringothamnus pulchellus
Deeringothamnus rugelii

References

External links
Plant systematics
PPP-index
Catalogue of Life

Annonaceae
Annonaceae genera